Rajalakshmy is a playback singer and made her mark in the Malayalam film music industry by winning the Kerala State Film Award for the Best Playback Singer in 2011.

Personal life 

Rajalakshmy was born on 13 October, in to a musical family in Eranakulam. Her talent was recognized at a very early age by her mother Parvathy, who was a professional singer in the early 1960s. Rajalakshmy attended St. Ann's English Medium Higher Secondary School, Eloor and Government Girls Higher Secondary School, Eranakulam. She attained a bachelor's degree in English literature from St. Teresa's College, Eranakulam.

Professional career 

Rajalakshmy began her career at the age of nine. She appeared as a child artist in hundreds of ganamela stages of Tansen Music, Cochin Kalabhavan, Cochin Melodies, C.A.C. She did more than 1000 musical albums, and worked with music directors K. Raghavan, Raveendran, Johnson, Jerry Amaldev, Syam, Ouseppachan, Mohan Sitara Jaya (Vijaya), Vidyasagar, Sharett, M. Jayachandran, Jassie Gift, Bijibal, Deepak Dev, Gopi sundar , Afsal Yusaf, Stephan Devassy, and Rony Raphel. Doordarshan's Hamsadwany, the first music competition in Malayalam television, made Rajalakshmy more popular among viewers.
Rajalakshmy was introduced to the film industry by Jassie Gift in the film Aswaroodan directed by Jayaraj. But a break was given by M.Jayachandran in the film Orkuka Vallapozhum.

Discography

References

External links
www.musicindiaonline.com/list_albums/i/15-malayalam_movie_songs/11520-Rajalakshmi
http://newindianexpress.com/cities/kochi/article54859.ece
www.mathrubhumi.com internet edition on 10 June 2011

Indian women playback singers
Living people
Kannada playback singers
Film musicians from Kerala
Kerala State Film Award winners
Tamil playback singers
Malayalam playback singers
1983 births
Singers from Thiruvananthapuram
Women musicians from Kerala
21st-century Indian singers
21st-century Indian women singers
St. Teresa's College alumni